De Vree is a surname. Notable people with the surname include:

 Henk de Vree (1954), Dutch politician
 Nicolaes de Vree (1645–1702), Dutch Golden Age painter
 Johan de Vree (1938–2017), Dutch political scientist
 Freddy de Vree (1939–2004), Belgian poet, literary critic, and radiomaker